Carlos Saúl Facundo Menem Yoma (23 November 1968 – 15 March 1995), otherwise known as Carlos Menem Jr., was an Argentine rally driver. He was the son of former President of Argentina Carlos Menem.

Menem was born in La Rioja Province, Argentina. He started his rally career in 1987. Menem has competed in the World Rally Championship and PWRC. He died on March 15, 1995, while piloting a Bell 206B-3 helicopter with his friend and also racing driver, Silvio Oltra. The helicopter reportedly struck overhead power lines while taking off at San Nicolas, Argentina, and crashed, killing both men.

References

1968 births
1995 deaths
Sportspeople from La Rioja Province, Argentina
Argentine rally drivers
World Rally Championship drivers
Victims of aviation accidents or incidents in Argentina
Victims of aviation accidents or incidents in 1995
Victims of helicopter accidents or incidents
Unsolved deaths
Menem family
Argentine Muslims
Children of presidents of Argentina